The Courier was a brass era car manufactured by Sandusky Automobile Company in Sandusky, Ohio in 1904 and 1905.

The 1904 Courier was a runabout model. It could seat 2 passengers and sold for US$650, making it one of the lowest-priced cars on the market at the time. The flat-mounted single-cylinder engine, situated at the center of the car, produced . A 2-speed sliding transmission was fitted.

References
 Frank Leslie's Popular Monthly (January, 1904)

External links
"1904 Sandusky-Courier Model F Roadster", 2000 Ault Park Concours d'Elegance 
"Past Vehicles", Anderson Restoration

Veteran vehicles